The Central Avenue School is a historic school building in Anderson, Indiana, United States.  It was built in 1891, and is a two-story, Romanesque Revival style brick and stone building on a raised basement.  The building features two three-story towers.  Attached to the original building is a Bungalow / American Craftsman style addition constructed in 1921. The building housed a school until 1974.

It was listed on the National Register of Historic Places in 2007.

References

Further reading
 Anderson: A Pictorial History by Esther Dittlinger, copyright 1991, page 65,67

External links
 Indiana Historic Landmark Article on Central Avenue School

School buildings on the National Register of Historic Places in Indiana
Romanesque Revival architecture in Indiana
School buildings completed in 1891
Buildings and structures in Anderson, Indiana
National Register of Historic Places in Madison County, Indiana
1891 establishments in Indiana